Christopher Peterson may refer to:

Christopher Peterson (psychologist) (1950–2012), American psychology professor
Christopher Peterson (serial killer) (born 1969), American serial killer
Christopher Peterson (law professor) (born 1975), American legal scholar and candidate for Utah governor
Christopher Peterson (costume designer), American costume designer
Chris Peterson (producer) (born 1968), Canadian music producer
Chris Peterson (character), the lead character played by Chris Elliot in the 1990s sitcom Get a Life

See also 
Chris Petersen (disambiguation)